Timo Seppälä (born 27 June 1968) is a Finnish biathlete. He competed in the men's 20 km individual event at the 1994 Winter Olympics.

References

External links
 

1968 births
Living people
Finnish male biathletes
Olympic biathletes of Finland
Biathletes at the 1994 Winter Olympics
People from Kauhajoki
Sportspeople from South Ostrobothnia